Cai Ronggen (born September 1964) is a Chinese physicist and an academician at the Chinese Academy of Sciences.

Biography
Cai was born in Hangzhou, Zhejiang in September 1964. After the resumption of the college entrance examination, he was accepted to Hangzhou Normal University, where he majored in physics. He earned his master's degree from Sichuan University in 1987 and his doctorate from Fudan University in 1995.

In July 1995, he joined the Institute of Theoretical Physics at the Chinese Academy of Sciences (CAS) as a researcher. Two years later, he became a researcher at the Center for Theoretical Physics at Seoul National University. In September 1999, he moved to the Department of Physics at Osaka University as a researcher. 

In 2017, Cai was elected an academician at CAS. In January 2018, he became a member of the 13th National Committee of the Chinese People's Political Consultative Conference.

Award
 2011 Second Prize of National Natural Science Award

References

1964 births
Scientists from Hangzhou
Living people
Hangzhou Normal University alumni
Sichuan University alumni
Fudan University alumni
Members of the Chinese Academy of Sciences
Physicists from Zhejiang